The (Uipo) Khoibu  /ˌuɪː pə͜ʊ ˈkʰɔɪ buː/ are a community of Manipur.  They speak the Khoibu language and call themselves "Uipo".    Neighbouring Tangkhul villagers call them ‘Apo’ .  Marings call the "Uipowaa".  They were called ‘Upong’ in the Inthee (believed to be so called ‘Ningthee’ in Meiteilon and ‘Chindwin’ in English) basin civilization.

Status of Uipo (Khoibu) Tribe 
With reference to the Ministry of States’ letter No.D.4101-B-49, dated 28 April 1949, the Dewan of Manipur State, vide his letter No.2/AG/49/0695-96 dated 6 June 1949, gave the list Scheduled Tribes of Manipur mentioning ‘Khoibu’ at serial No.18 of the list for inclusion in the Draft Constitution of India.  The latest recognition document is the one granted by Manipur Hill Area Committee, which is a statutory body under the Constitution of India, in its Resolution No.4(HAC) 2002 dated 28 October 2002, vide order Memo No.4/3/2002-LA (HAC), Imphal dated 11 November 2002. The Manipur Legislative Assembly Hill Area Committee (HAC), in the year 2002 and 2011, recommended the recognition of the Khoibus as a separate tribe to authorities concerned 

In the year 2015, the GPRN recognised the Uipo (Khoibu) as a separate Naga tribe.  The Uipo Maruo Koukartuo (UMK) appreciated the GPRN for standing for the rights of the minority by looking into the matter objectively and taking a very matured decision. “The decision of the GPRN in recognizing UIPO(Khoibu) as a separate Naga tribe is a reaffirmation that minorities have hope and there can be justice. It has reaffirmed the people in the RULE of LAW” the UMK observed.

Settlement 
 Khoibu Khullen is the oldest and the first Khoibu settlement village in the eastern hills of Manipur neighbouring Myanmar.  The identity of the Khoibu is at stake yet the Khoibu has been able to retain their identity despite odds.  Despite their identity being ignored, suppressed and repressed by tribals and non-tribals, the Khoibu has been able to retain their identity so far.

Rituals and Festivals

Khoibu Language

Uipo (Khoibu) language is classified as a southern Tangkhulic language of the Tibeto-Burman family. It is spoken by approximately 2800 speakers in Manipur.. With this low number of speakers, who are all at least bilingual with Manipuri, the language is endangered. Consequently, it is expected to be declared as an endangered language with the subsequent call for the protection of the cultural, linguistic and historical heritage. In 2020 community activist Mr. Mosyel Syelsaangthyel Khaling became the first Indian citizen to receive the Excellence in Community Linguistics Award of the Linguistic Society of America - the most prestigious award for linguistic activism in the world.

Political weakness 
The Uipo (Khoibu) tribe is a highly endangered community of Manipur and in great need of social recognition and constitutional protection from the Government since their identity, traditions and cultures are endangered and today hanging on the brink of extinction. The equation of powers among the ethnic enclosures in hill areas of the state also matters while deciding who should be recognised as tribe or ST. Even the state that has the authority to recognise tribes as schedule tribe is influenced by strong lobby of a powerful tribe who is against the recognition of certain groups as ST.

The case study of Khoibus is important because it is a case of negotiating a distinct tribal identity in between the ethnic enclosures in Manipur. It is argued that the enclosures of tribes around the generic ethnic identities like Naga have made cultural identity of Khoibus invisible. The study is also important in the sense that despite non-recognition of Khoibu as an official tribe, they live themselves as an independent tribe.

References

Ethnic groups in Manipur